CIO50 is an annual list compiled and published by CIO magazine since 2016. The purpose is to list the Australia's 50 top 50 technology and digital chiefs who are influencing rapid technology-driven change and innovation across their organisations.

CIO50 lists

Below is the top 50 for each year since the list's inception.

2016
This is the 2016 List

2017

2018

2019

References

External links
Latest CIO50 Results

Annual magazine issues
Chief information officers